Arthur Tyler may refer to:

 Arthur Tyler (bobsleigh) (1915–2008), American bobsledder
 Arthur Tyler (politician) (1883–1972), Australian politician
 Arthur Tyler (cricketer) (1907–1985), English cricketer and British Army officer